Henry Parsons    was a Massachusetts  politician who served as tenth and twelfth Mayor, of Marlborough, Massachusetts.

Early life
Parsons was naturalized an American citizen in Auburn, New York on October 12, 1865.

Notes

Mayors of Marlborough, Massachusetts
Republican Party Massachusetts state senators
Year of birth missing
Year of death missing